Tetramorium pacificum, is a species of ant in the subfamily Myrmicinae. It is found in many countries.

References

External links

 at antwiki.org
Animaldiversity.org
Itis.org
AntKey.org

pacificum
Hymenoptera of Asia
Insects described in 1870